"Las Mañanitas" is a traditional Mexican birthday song.

'Las Mañanitas may also refer to:

 Las Mañanitas (celebration), an annual event held in Ponce, Puerto Rico
 Las Mañanitas, Panama, a town in Panama Province
 Las Mañanitas metro station, a rapid transit station serving the area
 Las Mañanitas (Mexibús), a BRT station in Nezahualcóyotl, Mexico